Franz Christoph Anton, Count of Hohenzollern-Sigmaringen (16 January 1699 in Haigerloch – 23 November 1767 in Cologne) was a member of the House of Hohenzollern.  He was canon of several cathedral chapters and also first minister of the Prince-Archbishopric of Cologne under Archbishop Clemens August.  From 1750 until his death, he was also the ruling count of Hohenzollern-Haigerloch.

Life 
He was the son of Count Franz Anton of Hohenzollern-Haigerloch and his wife Anna Maria Eusebia of Königsegg-Aulendorf.  His elder brother Ferdinand Leopold was also at various times canon of several cathedral chapters, first minister of Cologne, and ruling Count of Hohenzollern-Haigerloch.

In 1717, Franz Christoph Anton became canon in Cologne.  In 1725, he became cathedral chaplain.  From 1726, he was also canon in Strasbourg and Salzburg.  Between 1748 and 1750, he was Chorbishop at Cologne and from 1750 to 1763, he was Vice Dean, and also Cathedral Treasurer.  In 1763, he succeeded Asseburg as first minister under Prince-Archbishop Clemens August.  He also served as Hofmeister, war councillor, governor of the Diocese of Strasbourg and chancellor of the University of Cologne.  From 1763, he was provost (religion) of Cologne cathedral.

He died on 23 November 1767 and was buried in the Cologne Cathedral.

References 
 F. E. von Mering: Clemens August, Herzog von Baiern, Kurfürst und Erzbischof zu Köln. Biographischer Versuch. Heberle, Cologne, 1851, p. 88, Online.
 Fortgesetzte neue genealogisch-historische Nachrichten von den vornehmsten Begebenheiten, welche sich an den europäischen Höfen zugetragen, Heinsius, Leipzig 1768, p. 457.

External links 
 Hohenzollern family tree

Counts of Hohenzollern-Haigerloch
Hohenzollern-Sigmaringen, Franz Christoph
House of Hohenzollern
1699 births
1767 deaths
18th-century German people